Jeffrey Klarik is an American writer and producer. With his partner David Crane (co-creator of Friends), Klarik co-created the award-winning BBC/Showtime comedy Episodes featuring Friends star Matt LeBlanc and Green Wing's Stephen Mangan and Tamsin Greig, the fifth and final series of which aired in 2017.

Klarik and Crane also created the ensemble sitcom The Class. He was a co-producer of the NBC television sitcom Mad About You. In 2002 he created the UPN series Half & Half, which ran for four seasons.

Klarik is Jewish.

Filmography

References

External links

American gay writers
Living people
American television producers
Place of birth missing (living people)
Year of birth missing (living people)
Jewish American screenwriters
Showrunners
LGBT producers
American male television writers
21st-century American Jews